Niagara Falls Armory is a historic New York National Guard armory located at Niagara Falls in Niagara County, New York.  It consists of a two-story, hip-roofed administrative building with a one-story drill hall built in 1895 in a castellated, fortress-like style typical of that period. It was designed by architect Isaac G. Perry.  The administration building features a -story round tower at the southwest corner, and a three-story round tower at the northwest corner.

It was listed on the National Register of Historic Places in 1995.

References

External links
Niagara Falls Armory - U.S. National Register of Historic Places on Waymarking.com

Armories on the National Register of Historic Places in New York (state)
Government buildings completed in 1895
Infrastructure completed in 1895
Buildings and structures in Niagara Falls, New York
National Register of Historic Places in Niagara County, New York